Rajasenan is an Indian film director who has worked in Malayalam cinema. He is one of the most successful directors in 90s Malayalam film industry. Rajasenan also worked in the TV serial industry. He directed some serials and also acted in some. He is mostly remembered for his association with actor Jayaram and the popular duo has worked together in 16 movies.

Career
He made his debut with the 1984 film Aagraham. His notable films include Kadinjool Kalyanam (1991), Ayalathe Adheham (1992), Meleparambil Aanveedu (1993), CID Unnikrishnan B.A., B.Ed (1994), Vardhakya Puranam (1994), Aadyathe Kanmani (1995), Aniyan Bava Chetan Bava (1995), Kadhanayakan (1997), The Car (1997), Sreekrishnapurathe Nakshathrathilakkam (1998), and Darling Darling (2000). Rajasenan also acted in the lead role in Bharya Onnu Makkal Moonnu (2009), which was also directed by himself. Rajasenan had Jayaram as his lead role in 16 of his 37 films (to date), of which the vast majority were hit movies.

Personal life
He is married to Sreelatha and has a daughter, Devika.Rajasenan's late father, Appukuttan Nair was a dance master.

Filmography

Director

Producer

Wound (2014)

Writer 
 Wound (2014) (writer)
 Madhuchandralekha (2006) (story)
 Immini Nalloraal (2005) (writer)
 Swapna Lokathe Balabhaskaran (1996) (story) (as Sridevi)
 Aadyathe Kanmani (1995) (story) (as Sridevi)
 Marupacha (1982) (Writer) (Uncredited)

Music Composer 
 Soundaryappinakkam (1985)
 Onnu Randu Moonnu (1986)

Actor 
 Priyapettavar (2018) as Gopinathan Menon
 Thinkal Muthal Velli Vare (2015) as Himself
 Wound  (2014) as Devadas
 Oru Small Family (2010) as R. Vishwanathan
 Nalla Pattukare (2010)
 Bharya Onnu Makkal Moonnu (2009) as Chandramohan Thampi
 Kanninum Kannadikkum (2004) as Himself
 Soundaryappinakkam (1985) as Potti
 Sree Ayyappanum Vavarum (1982) as Indra

Television 
Serials
Sambavami Yuge Yuge  (Surya TV) (direction)
Bhagyanakshatram (direction)
Krishnakripasagaram (Amrita TV) (direction) 
Ente Manasaputhri (Asianet) (Actor)
 Parinayam (Mazhavil Manorama) (Actor)
Swathi Nakshatram Chothi (Zee Keralam) (actor)
Other shows
Sallapam (DD)
Sangeetha Sagaram (Asianet)
Sangeetha Sagaram (Asianet Plus)

References

External links 

What happened to Rajasenan?

Malayalam film directors
Living people
Malayalam screenwriters
Male actors from Thiruvananthapuram
Male actors in Malayalam cinema
Indian male television actors
Film directors from Thiruvananthapuram
20th-century Indian film directors
21st-century Indian film directors
21st-century Indian male actors
Indian male film actors
Male actors in Malayalam television
Screenwriters from Thiruvananthapuram
1958 births